The historical ties between France and the United Kingdom, and the countries preceding them, are long and complex, including conquest, wars, and alliances at various points in history. The Roman era saw both areas largely conquered by Rome, whose fortifications largely remain in both countries to this day. The Norman conquest of England in 1066 decisively shaped English history, as well as the English language; English's vocabulary is 50% derived from French, with the vast majority of large and complex words being of French origin and very similar in writing, but different in pronunciation and sometimes with a slightly different meaning. Throughout the Middle Ages and into the Early Modern Period, France and England were often bitter rivals, with both nations' monarchs claiming control over France and France routinely allying against England with their other rival Scotland until the Union of the Crowns. Some of the noteworthy conflicts include the Hundred Years' War and the French Revolutionary Wars which ended in French victories, as well as the Seven Years' War and Napoleonic Wars, from which Great Britain emerged victorious.

The rivalry between the two nations was seeded when the Angevin House of Plantagenet gained control over England and additional French territories and engaged in a struggle with the French ruling House of Capet to retain their French holdings; this culminated in the Hundred Years' War, which began when the final Plantagenet holdings in France were confiscated and Edward III made his formal claim to the French throne. This decisive conflict resulted in a French victory, after which England would never again establish a foothold in French territory. The rivalry continued into the early modern period, with the fighting often spilling over to both countries' overseas colonies. Major conflicts from this period include the Italian wars, the French wars of religion, the Nine Years' War, the War of the Spanish Succession, the War of the Austrian Succession, the Seven Years' War and the American Revolutionary War.

The last major conflict between the two was the French Revolutionary and Napoleonic Wars (1793–1815), in which coalitions of European powers, financed and usually led by London, fought a series of wars against the French First Republic, the First French Empire and its client states, culminating in the defeat of Napoleon in 1815. Although the last war between the two sides, fears of further escalations arose around a possible French invasion in 1859 and during the later rivalry for African colonies. Nevertheless, peace has generally prevailed since Napoleon, and friendly ties between the two were formally established with the 1904 Entente Cordiale, and the British and French were allied against Germany in both World War I and World War II; in the latter conflict, British armies helped to liberate occupied France from the Nazis.

Both France and the UK were key partners in the West during the Cold War, with governments of both countries consistently supporting liberal democracy and capitalism. France and the UK were founding members of the North Atlantic Treaty Organization (NATO) defence alliance and are both permanent members of the UN Security Council. France has been a member of the European Union (EU), and its predecessors, since creation as the European Economic Community in 1957. The UK joined in 1973. In the 1960s, relations deteriorated due to French President Charles de Gaulle's concerns over the special relationship between the UK and the United States, which is often cited as a reason for de Gaulle continuously vetoing British entry into the European Communities, the predecessor organisation to the EU; de Gaulle also withdrew France from NATO integrated command, arguing the alliance was too heavily dominated by the United States.

Following de Gaulle's death, the UK entered the European Communities, and France returned to an active role in NATO. Since then, the two countries have experienced a close relationship, especially on defence and foreign policy issues; however the two countries disagreed on a range of other matters, most notably the direction of the European Union. The United Kingdom left the European Union on 31 January 2020, following a referendum held on 23 June 2016, commonly known as Brexit. Relations have since deteriorated, with disagreements surrounding Brexit and the English Channel migrant crisis. France and Britain are often still referred to as "historic rivals", or with emphasis on the perceived ever-lasting competition between the two countries. French author José-Alain Fralon characterised the relationship between the countries by describing the British as "our most dear enemies".

It is estimated that about 350,000 French people live in the UK, with approximately 200,000 Britons living in France.

History

Roman and post-Roman era
When Julius Caesar invaded Gaul, he encountered allies of the Gauls and Belgae from southeastern Britain offering assistance, some of whom even acknowledged the king of the Belgae as their sovereign.

Although all the peoples concerned were Celts (as the Germanic Angles and Franks had not yet invaded either country that would later bear their names), this could arguably be seen as the first major example of Anglo-French co-operation in recorded history. As a consequence, Caesar felt compelled to invade, in an attempt to subdue Britain. Rome was reasonably successful at conquering Gaul, Britain and Belgica; and all three areas became provinces of the Roman Empire.

For the next five hundred years, there was much interaction between the two regions, as both Britain and France were under Roman rule. After the fall of the Western Roman Empire, this was followed by another five hundred years with very little interaction between the two, as both were invaded by different Germanic tribes. Anglo-Saxonism rose from a mixture of Brythonism and Scandinavian immigration in Britain to conquer the Picts and Gaels. France saw intermixture with and partial conquest by Germanic tribes such as the Salian Franks to create the Frankish kingdoms. Christianity as a religion spread through all areas involved during this period, replacing the Germanic, Celtic and pre-Celtic forms of worship. The deeds of chieftains in this period would produce the legendaria around King Arthur and Camelot – now believed to be a legend based on the deeds of many early medieval British chieftains – and the more historically verifiable Charlemagne, the Frankish king who founded the Holy Roman Empire throughout much of Western Europe. At the turn of the second millennium, the British Isles were primarily involved with the Scandinavian world, while France's main foreign relationship was with the Holy Roman Empire.

Before the Conquest
Prior to the Norman Conquest of 1066, there were no armed conflicts between the Kingdom of England and the Kingdom of France. France and England were subject to repeated Viking invasions, and their foreign preoccupations were primarily directed toward Scandinavia.

Such cross-Channel relations as England had were directed toward Normandy, a quasi-independent fief owing homage to the French king; Emma, daughter of Normandy's Duke Richard, became queen to two English kings in succession; two of her sons, Harthacnut and Edward the Confessor later became kings of England. Edward spent much of his early life (1013–1041) in Normandy and, as king, favoured certain Normans with high office, such as Robert of Jumièges, who became Archbishop of Canterbury.

This gradual Normanization of the realm set the stage for the Norman Conquest, in which Emma's brother's grandson, William, Duke of Normandy, gained the kingdom in the first successful cross-Channel invasion since Roman times. Together with its new ruler, England acquired the foreign policy of the Norman dukes, which was based on protecting and expanding Norman interests at the expense of the French kings. Although William's rule over Normandy had initially had the backing of King Henry I of France, William's success had soon created hostility, and in 1054 and 1057, King Henry had twice attacked Normandy.

Norman conquest
However, in the mid-eleventh century, there was a dispute over the English throne, and the French-speaking Normans, who were of Viking, Frankish, and Gallo-Roman stock, invaded England under their duke William the Conqueror and took over following the Battle of Hastings in 1066, and crowned themselves Kings of England. The Normans took control of the land and the political system. Feudal culture took root in England, and for the next 150 years England was generally considered of secondary importance to the dynasty's Continental territories, notably in Normandy and other western French provinces. The language of the aristocracy was French for several hundred years after the Norman Conquest. Many French words were adopted into the English language as a result. About one third of the English language is derived from or through various forms of French. The first Norman kings were also the Dukes of Normandy, so relations were somewhat complicated between the countries. Though they were dukes ostensibly under the king of France, their higher level of organisation in Normandy gave them more de facto power. In addition, they were kings of England in their own right; England was not officially a province of France, nor a province of Normandy.

Breton War, 1076–1077
This war was fought between the years 1076 to 1077.

Vexin War, 1087
In 1087, following the monastic retirement of its last count, William and Philip partitioned between themselves the Vexin, a small but strategically important county on the middle Seine that controlled the traffic between Paris and Rouen, the French and Norman capitals. With this buffer state eliminated, Normandy and the king's royal demesne (the Île-de-France) now directly bordered on each other, and the region would be the flashpoint for several future wars. In 1087, William responded to border raids conducted by Philip's soldiers by attacking the town of Mantes, during the sack of which he received an accidental injury that turned fatal.

Rebellion of 1088

With William's death, his realms were parted between his two sons (England to William Rufus, Normandy to Robert Curthose) and the Norman-French border war concluded. Factional strains between the Norman barons, faced with a double loyalty to William's two sons, created a brief civil war in which an attempt was made to force Rufus off the English throne. With the failure of the rebellion, England and Normandy were clearly divided for the first time since 1066.

Wars in the Vexin and Maine, 1097–1098
Robert Curthose left on crusade in 1096, and for the duration of his absence Rufus took over the administration of Normandy. Soon afterwards (1097) he attacked the Vexin and the next year the County of Maine. Rufus succeeded in defeating Maine, but the war in the Vexin ended inconclusively with a truce in 1098.

Anglo-Norman War, 1101
In August 1100, William Rufus was killed by an arrow shot while hunting. His younger brother, Henry Beauclerc immediately took the throne. It had been expected to go to Robert Curthose, Duke of Normandy, but Robert was away on a crusade and did not return until a month after Rufus' death, by which time Henry was firmly in control of England, and his accession had been recognised by France's King Philip. Robert was, however, able to reassert his control over Normandy, though only after giving up the County of Maine.

England and Normandy were now in the hands of the two brothers, Henry and Robert. In July 1101, Robert launched an attack on England from Normandy. He landed successfully at Portsmouth, and advanced inland to Alton in Hampshire. There he and Henry came to an agreement to accept the status quo of the territorial division. Henry was freed from his homage to Robert, and agreed to pay the Duke an annual sum (which, however, he only paid until 1103).

Anglo-Norman War, 1105–1106
Following increasing tensions between the brothers, and evidence of the weakness of Robert's rule, Henry I invaded Normandy in the spring of 1105, landing at Barfleur. The ensuing Anglo-Norman war was longer and more destructive, involving sieges of Bayeux and Caen; but Henry had to return to England in the late summer, and it was not until the following summer that he was able to resume the conquest of Normandy. In the interim, Duke Robert took the opportunity to appeal to his liege lord, King Philip, but could obtain no aid from him. The fate of Robert and the duchy was sealed at the Battle of Tinchebray on 28 or 29 September 1106: Robert was captured and imprisoned for the rest of his life. Henry was now, like his father, both King of England and Duke of Normandy, and the stage was set for a new round of conflict between England and France.

Anglo-French War, 1117–1120
In 1108, Philip I, who had been king of France since before the Norman Conquest, died and was succeeded by his son Louis VI, who had already been conducting the administration of the realm in his father's name for several years.

Louis had initially been hostile to Robert Curthose, and friendly to Henry I; but with Henry's acquisition of Normandy, the old Norman-French rivalries re-emerged. From 1109 to 1113, clashes erupted in the Vexin; and in 1117 Louis made a pact with Baldwin VII of Flanders, Fulk V of Anjou, and various rebellious Norman barons to overthrow Henry's rule in Normandy and replace him with William Clito, Curthose's son. By luck and diplomacy, however, Henry eliminated the Flemings and Angevins from the war, and on 20 August 1119 at the Battle of Bremule he defeated the French. Louis was obliged to accept Henry's rule in Normandy, and accepted his son William Adelin's homage for the fief in 1120.

High Middle Ages

During the reign of the closely related Plantagenet dynasty, which was based in its Angevin Empire, and at the height of the empires size, 1/3 of France was under Angevin control as well as all of England. However, almost all of the Angevin empire was lost to Philip II of France under Richard the Lionheart, John and Henry III of England. This finally gave the English a separate identity as an Anglo-Saxon people under a Francophone, but not French, crown.

While the English and French had been frequently acrimonious, they had always had a common culture and little fundamental difference in identity. Nationalism had been minimal in days when most wars took place between rival feudal lords on a sub-national scale. The last attempt to unite the two cultures under such lines was probably a failed French-supported rebellion to depose Edward II. It was also during the Middle Ages that a Franco-Scottish alliance, known as the Auld Alliance was signed by King John of Scotland and Philip IV of France.

The Hundred Years' War

The English monarchy increasingly integrated with its subjects and turned to the English language wholeheartedly during the Hundred Years' War between 1337 and 1453. Though the war was in principle a mere dispute over territory, it drastically changed societies on both sides of the Channel. The English, although already politically united, for the first time found pride in their language and identity, while the French united politically.

Several of the most famous Anglo-French battles took place during the Hundred Years' War: Crécy, Poitiers, Agincourt, Orléans, Patay, Formigny and Castillon. Major sources of French pride stemmed from their leadership during the war. Bertrand du Guesclin was a brilliant tactician who forced the English out of the lands they had procured at the Treaty of Brétigny, a compromising treaty that most Frenchmen saw as a humiliation. Joan of Arc was another unifying figure who to this day represents a combination of religious fervour and French patriotism to all France. After her inspirational victory at Orléans and what many saw as Joan's martyrdom at the hands of Burgundians and Englishmen, Jean de Dunois eventually forced the English out of all of France except Calais, which was only lost in 1558. Apart from setting national identities, the Hundred Years' War was the root of the traditional rivalry and at times hatred between the two countries. During this era, the English lost their last territories in France, except Calais, which would remain in English hands for another 105 years, though the English monarchs continued to style themselves as Kings of France until 1800.

The Franco-Scots Alliance

France and Scotland agreed to defend each other in the event of an attack on either from England in several treaties, the most notable of which were in 1327 and 1490. There had always been intermarriage between the Scottish and French royal households, but this solidified the bond between the royals even further.
Scottish historian J. B. Black took a critical view, arguing regarding the alliance:
The Scots...love for their 'auld' ally had never been a positive sentiment nourished by community of culture, but an artificially created affection resting on the negative basis of enmity to England.

The early modern period

The English and French were engaged in numerous wars in the following centuries. They took opposite sides in all of the Italian Wars between 1494 and 1559.

An even deeper division set in during the English Reformation, when most of England converted to Protestantism and France remained Roman Catholic. This enabled each side to see the other as not only a foreign evil but also a heretical one. In both countries there was intense civil religious conflict. Because of the oppression by Roman Catholic King Louis XIII of France, many Protestant Huguenots fled to England. Similarly, many Catholics fled from England to France.  Scotland had a very close relationship with France in the 16th century, with intermarriage at the highest level.

Henry VIII of England had initially sought an alliance with France, and the Field of the Cloth of Gold saw a face to face meeting between him and King Francis I of France.  Mary, Queen of Scots (1542–1587) was born to King James V and his French second wife, Mary of Guise and became Queen when her father was killed in the wars with England. Her mother became Regent, brought in French advisors, and ruled Scotland in the French style. David Ditchburn and Alastair MacDonald argue:
Protestantism was, however, given an enormous boost in Scotland, especially among the governing classes, by the suffocating political embrace of Catholic France. The threat to Scotland's independence seem to come most potently from France, not England... And absorption by France was not a future that appealed to Scots.
Queen Elizabeth I, whose own legitimacy was challenged by Mary Queen of Scots, worked with the Protestant Scottish Lords to expel the French from Scotland in 1560. The Treaty of Edinburgh in 1560 virtually ended the "auld alliance." Protestant Scotland tied its future to Protestant England, rejecting Catholic France. However, friendly relations at the business level did continue.

17th century

While Spain had been the dominant world power in the sixteenth and early seventeenth centuries, the English had often sided with France as a counterweight against them. This design was intended to keep a European balance of power, and prevent one country gaining overwhelming supremacy. France replaced Spain as the dominant power after 1650 so the basis of English strategy was the fear that a French universal monarchy of Europe would be able to overwhelm the British Isles.

At the conclusion of the English Civil War, the newly formed Republic under Oliver Cromwell, "the Commonwealth of England" joined sides with the French against Spain during the last decade of the Franco-Spanish War (1635–1659). The English were particularly interested in the troublesome city of Dunkirk and in accordance with the alliance the city was given to the English after the Battle of the Dunes (1658), but after the monarchy was restored in England, Charles II sold it back to the French in 1662 for £320,000.

Following the conclusion of the Thirty Years' War (1618–1648) Treaty of Westphalia in 1648, and as France finally overcame its rebellious "princes of the blood" and Protestant Huguenots, the long fought wars of the Fronde (civil wars) finally came to an end. At the same time Spain's power was severely weakened by decades of wars and rebellions – and France, began to take on a more assertive role under King Louis XIV of France with an expansionist policy both in Europe and across the globe. English foreign policy was now directed towards preventing France gaining supremacy on the continent and creating a universal monarchy. To the French, England was an isolated and piratical nation heavily reliant on naval power, and particularly privateers, which they referred to as Perfidious Albion.

However, in 1672, the English again formed an alliance with the French (in accordance with the Secret Treaty of Dover of 1670) against their common commercial rival, the rich Dutch Republic – the two nations fighting side by side during the Franco-Dutch War (1672–1678) and Third Anglo-Dutch War (1672–1674). This war was extremely unpopular in England. The English had been soundly beaten at sea by the Dutch and were in a worsening financial situation as their vulnerable global trade was under increasing threat. The English pulled out of the alliance in 1674, ending their war with the Netherlands and actually joining them against the French in the final year of the Franco-Dutch War in 1678.

During the course of the century a sharp diversion in political philosophies emerged in the two states. In England King Charles I had been executed during the English Civil War for exceeding his powers, and later King James II had been overthrown in the Glorious Revolution. In France, the decades long Fronde (civil wars), had seen the French Monarchy triumphant and as a result the power of the monarchs and their advisors became almost absolute and went largely unchecked.

England and France fought each other in the War of the League of Augsburg from 1688 to 1697 which set the pattern for relations between France and Great Britain during the eighteenth century. Wars were fought intermittently, with each nation part of a constantly shifting pattern of alliances known as the stately quadrille.

Second Hundred Years' War 1689–1815

18th century

Partly out of fear of a continental intervention, an Act of Union was passed in 1707 creating the Kingdom of Great Britain, and formally merging the kingdoms of Scotland and England (the latter kingdom included Wales). While the new Britain grew increasingly parliamentarian, France continued its system of absolute monarchy.

The newly united Britain fought France in the War of the Spanish Succession from 1702 to 1713, and the War of the Austrian Succession from 1740 to 1748, attempting to maintain the balance of power in Europe. The British had a massive navy but maintained a small land army, so Britain always acted on the continent in alliance with other states such as Prussia and Austria as they were unable to fight France alone. Equally France, lacking a superior navy, was unable to launch a successful invasion of Britain.

 France lent support to the Jacobite pretenders who claimed the British throne, hoping that a restored Jacobite monarchy would be inclined to be more pro-French. Despite this support the Jacobites failed to overthrow the Hanoverian monarchs.

The quarter century after the Treaty of Utrecht in 1713 was peaceful, with no major wars, and only a few secondary military episodes of minor importance. The main powers had exhausted themselves in warfare, with many deaths, disabled veterans, ruined navies, high pension costs, heavy loans and high taxes. Utrecht strengthened the sense of useful international law and inaugurated an era of relative stability in the European state system, based on balance-of-power politics that no one country would become dominant. Robert Walpole, the key British policy maker, prioritised peace in Europe because it was good for his trading nation and its growing British Empire. British historian G. M. Trevelyan argues:
That Treaty [of Utrecht], which ushered in the stable and characteristic period of Eighteenth-Century civilisation, marked the end of danger to Europe from the old French monarchy, and it marked a change of no less significance to the world at large, — the maritime, commercial and financial supremacy of Great Britain.
But "balance" needed armed enforcement. Britain played a key military role as "balancer." The goals were to bolster Europe's balance of power system to maintain peace that was needed for British trade to flourish and its colonies to grow, and finally to strengthen its own central position in the balance of power system in which no one could dominate the rest.  Other nations recognised Britain as the "balancer."  Eventually the balancing act required Britain to contain French ambitions. Containment led to a series of increasingly large-scale wars between Britain and France, which ended with mixed results. Britain was usually aligned with the Netherlands and Prussia, and subsidised their armies. These wars enveloped all of Europe and the overseas colonies. These wars took place in every decade starting in the 1740s and climaxed in the defeat of Napoleon's France in 1814.

As the century wore on, there was a distinct passage of power to Britain and France, at the expense of traditional major powers such as Portugal, Spain and the Dutch Republic. Some observers saw the frequent conflicts between the two states during the 18th century as a battle for control of Europe, though most of these wars ended without a conclusive victory for either side. France largely had greater influence on the continent while Britain were dominant at sea and trade, threatening French colonies abroad.

Overseas expansion

From the 1650s, the New World increasingly became a battleground between the two powers. The Western Design of Oliver Cromwell intended to build up an increasing British presence in North America, beginning with the acquisition of Jamaica from the Spanish Empire in 1652. The first British settlement on continental North America was founded in 1607, and by the 1730s these had grown into thirteen separate colonies.

The French had settled the province of Canada to the North, and controlled Saint-Domingue in the Caribbean, the wealthiest colony in the world. Both countries, recognising the potential of India, established trading posts there. Wars between the two states increasingly took place in these other continents, as well as Europe.

Seven Years' War

The French and British fought each other and made treaties with Native American tribes to gain control of North America. Both nations coveted the Ohio Country and in 1753, a British expedition there led by George Washington clashed with a French force. Shortly afterwards the French and Indian War broke out, initially taking place only in North America but in 1756 becoming part of the wider Seven Years' War in which Britain and France were part of opposing coalitions.

The war has been called the first "world war", because fighting took place on several different continents. In 1759, the British enjoyed victories over the French in Europe, Canada and India, severely weakening the French position around the world. In 1762, the British captured the cities of Manila and Havana from Spain, France's strongest ally, which led ultimately to a peace settlement the following year that saw a large number of territories come under British control.

The Seven Years' War is regarded as a critical moment in the history of Anglo-French relations, which laid the foundations for the dominance of the British Empire during the next two and a half centuries.

South Seas

Having lost New France (Canada) and India in the northern hemisphere, many Frenchmen turned their attention to building a second empire south of the equator, thereby triggering a race for the Pacific Ocean. They were supported by King Louis XV and by the Duc de Choiseul, Minister for War and for the Navy.  In 1763, Louis Bougainville sailed from France with two ships, several families, cattle, horses and grain. He established the first colony in the Falkland Islands at Port Saint Louis in February 1764. This done, Bougainville's plan was to use the new settlement as a French base from where he could mount a search for the long-imagined (but still undiscovered) Southern Continent and claim it for France.

Meanwhile, the Secretary of the Admiralty, Philip Stephens, swiftly and secretly dispatched John Byron to the Falklands and round the world. He was followed in 1766 by Samuel Wallis who discovered Tahiti and claimed it for Britain. Bougainville followed and claimed Tahiti for France in 1768, but when he tried to reach the east coast of New Holland (Australia), he was thwarted by the Great Barrier Reef.

The Admiralty sent Captain Cook to the Pacific on three voyages of discovery in 1768, 1772 and 1776. Cook was killed in Hawaii in 1779 and his two ships, Resolution and Discovery, arrived home in October 1780.

At the same time, more Frenchmen were probing the South Seas. In 1769, Jean Surville sailed from India, through the Coral Sea to New Zealand then traversed the Pacific to Peru. In 1771, Marion Dufresne and Julien–Marie Crozet sailed through the Indian and Pacific Oceans. Later in 1771, another French expedition under Yves de Kerguelen and Louis St Aloüarn explored the southern Indian Ocean. St Aloüarn annexed the west coast of New Holland for France in March 1772.

In August 1785, King Louis XVI sent Jean-François Lapérouse to explore the Pacific Ocean. He arrived off Sydney Heads in January 1788, three days after the arrival of Britain's First Fleet commanded by Arthur Phillip. The French expedition departed Australia three months later in March 1788 and, according to the records, was never seen again.

The race for territory in the South Seas continued into the nineteenth century. Although the British had settled the eastern region of New Holland, in 1800 Napoleon dispatched an expedition commanded by Nicolas Baudin to forestall the British on the south and west coasts of the continent.

American War of Independence

As American Patriot dissatisfaction with British policies grew to rebellion in 1774–75, the French saw an opportunity to undermine British power. When the American War of Independence broke out in 1775, the French began sending covert supplies and intelligence to the American Patriots.

In 1778, France, eager to capitalise on the British defeat at Saratoga, recognised the United States of America as an independent nation. Negotiating with Ambassador Benjamin Franklin in Paris, they formed a military alliance. France in 1779 persuaded its ally Spain to declare war on Britain. France despatched troops to fight alongside the Americans, and besieged Gibraltar with Spain. Plans were drawn up, but never put into action, to launch an invasion of England. The threat forced Britain to keep many troops in Britain that were needed in America. The British were further required to withdraw forces from the American mainland to protect their more valuable possessions in the West Indies. While the French were initially unable to break the string of British victories, the combined actions of American and French forces, and a key victory by a French fleet over a British rescue fleet, forced the British into a decisive surrender at Yorktown, Virginia, in 1781. For a brief period after 1781, Britain's naval superiority was threatened subdued by an alliance between France and Spain. However, the British recovered, defeated the main French fleet in April 1782, and kept control of Gibraltar. In 1783 the Treaty of Paris gave the new nation control over most of the region east of the Mississippi River; Spain gained Florida from Britain and retained control of the vast Louisiana Territory; France received little except a huge debt.

The crippling debts incurred by France during the war, and the cost of rebuilding the French navy during the 1780s caused a financial crisis, helping contribute to the French Revolution of 1789.

The French Revolution and Napoleon

The continental European monarchies went to war against France to protect their monarchies against the Revolutionary threat of republics. The British goals were more complex: not just to defend its national security but even more to uphold the European balance of power so that France would not dominate the continent. British decision-making was in the hands of Prime Minister William Pitt and lords Grenville and Lord Melville. They devised strategies to use the superior Royal Navy and superior financial resources. Both sides demonised each other, thereby broadening the base of warfare to include the total population. London tried to foment rebellions inside France while Paris sent an invasion force to Ireland to stir up a revolt there. French leaders emphasised their nation's much larger population, the excitement of its revolutionary ideology, and popular hatred of the exiled aristocrats.

While France was plunged into chaos, Britain took advantage of its temporary weakness to stir up the civil war occurring in France and build up its naval forces. The Revolution was initially popular with many Britons, both because it appeared to weaken France and was perceived to be based on British liberal ideals. This began to change as the Jacobin faction took over, and began the Reign of Terror in 1793–1794.

The French were intent on spreading their revolutionary republicanism to other European states, including Britain. The British initially stayed out of the alliances of European states which unsuccessfully attacked France trying to restore the monarchy. In France a new, strong nationalism took hold enabling them to mobilise large and motivated forces. Following the execution of King Louis XVI of France in 1793, France declared war on Britain. This period of the French Revolutionary Wars was known as the War of the First Coalition. Except for a brief pause in 1802–03, the wars lasted continuously for 21 years. During this time Britain raised several coalitions against the French, continually subsidising other European states with gold (called the "Golden Cavalry of St George"), enabling them to put large armies in the field. In spite of this, the French armies were very successful on land, creating several client states such as the Batavian Republic, and the British devoted much of their own forces to campaigns against the French in the Caribbean, with mixed results. The British and their allies got off to a poor start in 1793–94. The main problem was poor coordination between London and Vienna, including delays in planning, poor preparations, and diversion of forces. The result was diplomatic and military reversals in Flanders in the summer of 1794.

First phase, 1792 to 1802 

Following the execution of King Louis XVI of France in 1793, France declared war on Britain. This period of the French Revolutionary Wars was known as the War of the First Coalition. It lasted from 1792 to 1797. Relying on its large Royal Navy rather than its small army, British strategy was to support smaller allies against France, and try to cut off food shipments. That was an innovative strategy in modern warfare, but the French prioritised feeding their army over the populace, and carried on.  Britain's continental allies did nearly all of the actual fighting on land. France meanwhile set up the conscription system that built up a much larger army than anyone else. After the king was executed, nearly all the senior officers went into exile, and a very young new generation of officers, typified by Napoleon, took over the French military. Britain relied heavily on the Royal Navy, which sank the French fleet at the Battle of the Nile in 1798, trapping the French army in Egypt. In 1799, Napoleon came to power in France, and created a dictatorship. Britain led the Second Coalition from 1798 to 1802 against Napoleon, but he generally prevailed. The Treaty of Amiens of 1802 was favourable to France. That treaty amounted to a year-long truce in the war, which was reopened by Britain in May 1803.

Britain ended the uneasy truce created by the Treaty of Amiens when it declared war on France in May 1803, thus starting the War of the Third Coalition, lasting from 1803 to 1805. The British were increasingly angered by Napoleon's reordering of the international system in Western Europe, especially in Switzerland, Germany, Italy and the Netherlands. Kagan argues that Britain was insulted and alarmed especially by Napoleon's assertion of control over Switzerland. Britons felt insulted when Napoleon said it deserved no voice in European affairs (even though King George was an elector of the Holy Roman Empire), and ought to shut down the London newspapers that were vilifying Napoleon. Russia, furthermore, decided that the Switzerland intervention indicated that Napoleon was not looking toward a peaceful resolution. Britain had a sense of loss of control, as well as loss of markets, and was worried by Napoleon's possible threat to its overseas colonies. McLynn argues that Britain went to war in 1803 out of a "mixture of economic motives and national neuroses – an irrational anxiety about Napoleon's motives and intentions." However, in the end it proved to be the right choice for Britain, because in the long run Napoleon's intentions were hostile to British national interest. Furthermore, Napoleon was not ready for war and this was the best time for Britain to stop them. Britain therefore seized upon the Malta issue (by refusing to follow the terms of the Treaty of Amiens and evacuate the island).

The deeper British grievances were that Napoleon was taking personal control of Europe, making the international system unstable, and forcing Britain to the sidelines.

Ireland 1798 
In 1798, French forces invaded Ireland to assist the United Irishmen who had launched a rebellion. Although the French joined by thousands of rebels, they were defeated by British and Irish loyalist forces. The fear of further attempts to create a French satellite in Ireland led to the Act of Union, merging the Kingdom of Great Britain and Kingdom of Ireland to create the United Kingdom in 1801. Ireland now lost its last vestiges of independence.

War resumes, 1803–1815 

After he had triumphed on the European continent against the other major European powers, Napoleon contemplated an invasion of the British mainland. That plan collapsed after the annihilation of the Franco-Spanish fleet at Trafalgar, coinciding with an Austrian attack over its Bavarian allies.

In response Napoleon established a continental system by which no nation was permitted to trade with the British. Napoleon hoped the embargo would isolate the British Isles severely weakening them, but a number of countries continued to trade with them in defiance of the policy. In spite of this, the Napoleonic influence stretched across much of Europe.

In 1808, French forces invaded Portugal trying to attempt to halt trade with Britain, turning Spain into a satellite state in the process. The British responded by dispatching a force under Sir Arthur Wellesley which captured Lisbon. Napoleon dispatched increasing forces into the Iberian Peninsula, which became the key battleground between the two nations. Allied with Spanish and Portuguese forces, the British inflicted a number of defeats on the French, confronted with a new kind of warfare called "guerrilla" which led Napoleon to brand it the "Spanish Ulcer".

In 1812, Napoleon's invasion of Russia caused a new coalition to form against him, in what became the War of the Sixth Coalition. In 1813, British forces defeated French forces in Spain and caused them to retreat into France. Allied to an increasingly resurgent European coalition, the British invaded southern France in October 1813, forcing Napoleon to abdicate and go into exile on Elba in 1814.

 Napoleon was defeated by combined British, Prussian and Dutch forces at Battle of Waterloo in June 1815. With strong British support, the Bourbon monarchy was restored and Louis XVIII was crowned King of France. The Napoleonic era was the last occasion on which Britain and France went to war with each other, but by no means marked the end of the rivalry between the two nations.   Viscount Castlereagh shaped British foreign policy as foreign minister 1812–1822; he led the moves against Napoleon 1812 and 1815. Once the Bourbon allies were back in power he established a partnership with France during the Congress of Vienna.

Long 19th century: 1789–1914

Britain and France never went to war after 1815, although there were a few "war scares." They were allied together against Russia in the Crimean War of the 1850s.

1815–1830

Britain emerged from the 1815 Congress of Vienna as the ultimate leading financial, military and colonial power of the world, going on to enjoy a century of global dominance in the Pax Britannica. France recovered from its defeat to rebuild its position on the world stage.  Talleyrand's friendly approaches were a precursor to the Entente Cordiale in the next century, but they lacked consistent direction and substance. Overcoming their historic enmity, the British and French eventually became political allies, as both began to turn their attentions to acquiring new territories beyond Europe. The British developed India and Canada and colonised Australia, spreading their powers to several different continents as the Second British Empire. Likewise the French were quite active in Southeast Asia and Africa.

They frequently made stereotypical jokes about each other, and even side by side in war were critical of each other's tactics. As a Royal Navy officer said to the French corsair Robert Surcouf "You French fight for money, while we British fight for honour.", Surcouf replied "Sir, a man fights for what he lacks the most." According to one story, a French diplomat once said to Lord Palmerston "If I were not a Frenchman, I should wish to be an Englishman"; to which Palmerston replied: "If I were not an Englishman, I should wish to be an Englishman." Upon seeing the disastrous British Charge of the Light Brigade in the Crimean War against Russia, French marshal Pierre Bosquet said 'C'est magnifique, mais ce n'est pas la guerre.' ('It's magnificent, but it's not war.') Eventually, relations settled down as the two empires tried to consolidate themselves rather than extend themselves.

July Monarchy and the beginning of the Victorian age

In 1830, France underwent the July Revolution to expel the reactionary Bourbon kings, and install the Orléanist Louis-Philippe as king. By contrast, the reign of Queen Victoria began in 1837 in a peaceful fashion. The major European powers—Russia, Austria, Britain, and to a lesser extent Prussia—were determined to keep France in check, and so France generally pursued a cautious foreign policy. Louis-Phillipe allied with Britain, the country with which France shared the most similar form of government, and its combative Foreign Secretary Lord Palmerston. In Louis-Philippe's first year in power, he refused to annex Belgium during its revolution, instead following the British line of supporting independence. Despite posturings from leading French minister Adolphe Thiers in 1839–1840 that France would protect the increasingly powerful Muhammad Ali of Egypt (a viceroy of the Ottoman Empire), any reinforcements were not forthcoming, and in 1840, much to France's embarrassment, Ali was forced to sign the Convention of London by the powers. Relations cooled again under the governments of François Guizot and Robert Peel. They soured once more in 1846 though when, with Palmerston back as Foreign Secretary, the French government hastily agreed to have Isabella II of Spain and her sister marry members of the Bourbon and Orléanist dynasties, respectively. Palmerston had hoped to arrange a marriage, and "The Affair of the Spanish Marriages" has generally been viewed unfavourably by British historians ("By the dispassionate judgment of history it has been universally condemned"), although a more sympathetic view has been taken in recent years.

Second French Empire

Lord Aberdeen (foreign secretary 1841–46) brokered an Entente Cordiale with François Guizot and France in the early 1840s. However Louis-Napoléon Bonaparte was elected president of France in 1848 and made himself Emperor Napoleon III in 1851. Napoleon III had an expansionist foreign policy, which saw the French deepen the colonisation of Africa and establish new colonies, in particular Indochina. The British were initially alarmed, and commissioned a series of forts in southern England designed to resist a French invasion. Lord Palmerston as foreign minister and prime minister had close personal ties with leading French statesmen, notably Napoleon III himself. Palmerston's goal was to arrange peaceful relations with France in order to free Britain's diplomatic hand elsewhere in the world.

Napoleon at first had a pro-British foreign policy, and was eager not to displease the British government whose friendship he saw as important to France. After a brief threat of an invasion of Britain in 1851, France and Britain cooperated in the 1850s, with an alliance in the Crimean War, and a major trade treaty in 1860.  The Cobden–Chevalier Treaty Of 1860 lowered tariffs in each direction, and began the British practice of encouraging lower tariffs across Europe, and using most favoured nation treaties. However Britain viewed the Second Empire with increasing distrust, especially as the emperor built up his navy, expanded his empire and took up a more active foreign policy.

The two nations were military allies during the Crimean War (1853–56) to curb Russia's expansion westwards and its threats to the Ottoman Empire. However, when London discovered that Napoleon III was secretly negotiating with Russia to form a postwar alliance to dominate Europe, it hastily abandoned its plan to end the war by attacking St. Petersburg. Instead Britain concluded an armistice with Russia that achieved none of its war aims.

There was a brief war scare in 1858-1860 as alarmists in England misinterpreted scattered hints as signs of an invasion, but Napoleon III never planned any such hostility. The two nations co-operated during the Second Opium War with China, dispatching a joint force to the Chinese capital Peking to force a treaty on the Chinese Qing Dynasty. In 1859 Napoleon, bypassing the Corps législatif which he feared would not approve of free trade, met with influential reformer Richard Cobden, and in 1860 the Cobden-Chevalier Treaty was signed between the two countries, reducing tariffs on goods sold between Britain and France.

During the American Civil War (1861-1865) both nations considered intervention to help the Confederacy and thereby regain cotton supplies, but remained neutral. The cutoff of cotton shipments caused economic depression in the textile industries of both Britain and France, resulting in widespread unemployment and suffering among workers. In the end France dared not enter alone and Britain refused to go to war because it depended on food shipments from New York.

Napoleon III attempted to gain British support when he invaded Mexico and  forcibly put his pawn Maximilian I on the throne. London was unwilling to support any action other than the collection of debts owed by the Mexicans. This forced the French to act alone in the French Intervention in Mexico. Washington, after winning the civil war, threatened an invasion to expel the French and Napoleon pulled out its troops. Emperor Maximilian remained behind and was executed. When Napoleon III was overthrown in 1870, he fled to exile in England.

Late 19th century 
In the 1875–1898 era, tensions were high, especially over Egyptian and African issues. At several points, these issues brought the two nations to the brink of war; but the situation was always defused diplomatically. For two decades, there was peace—but it was "an armed peace, characterized by alarms, distrust, rancour and irritation." During the Scramble for Africa in the 1880s, the British and French generally recognised each other's spheres of influence. In an agreement in 1890 Great Britain was recognised in Bahr-el-Ghazal and Darfur, while Wadai, Bagirmi, Kanem, and the territory to the north and east of Lake Chad were assigned to France.

The Suez Canal, initially built by the French, became a joint British-French project in 1875, as both saw it as vital to maintaining their influence and empires in Asia. In 1882, ongoing civil disturbances in Egypt (see Urabi Revolt) prompted Britain to intervene, extending a hand to France. France's expansionist Prime Minister Jules Ferry was out of office, and the government was unwilling to send more than an intimidating fleet to the region. Britain established a protectorate, as France had a year earlier in Tunisia, and popular opinion in France later put this action down to duplicity. It was about this time that the two nations established co-ownership of Vanuatu. The Anglo-French Convention of 1882 was also signed to resolve territory disagreements in western Africa.

One brief but dangerous dispute occurred during the Fashoda Incident in 1898 when French troops tried to claim an area in the Southern Sudan, and a British force purporting to be acting in the interests of the Khedive of Egypt arrived. Under heavy pressure the French withdrew and Britain took control over the area, As France recognised British control of the Sudan. France received control of the small kingdom of Wadai, Which consolidated its holdings in northwest Africa. France had failed in its main goals. P.M.H. Bell says:
Between the two governments there was a brief battle of wills, with the British insisting on immediate and unconditional French withdrawal from Fashoda. The French had to accept these terms, amounting to a public humiliation....Fashoda was long remembered in France as an example of British brutality and injustice."

Fashoda was a diplomatic victory for the British because the French realised that in the long run they needed friendship with Britain in case of a war between France and Germany.

20th century

The Entente Cordiale

From about 1900, Francophiles in Britain and Anglophiles in France began to spread a study and mutual respect and love of the culture of the country on the other side of the English Channel. Francophile and Anglophile societies developed, further introducing Britain to French food and wine, and France to English sports like rugby. French and English were already the second languages of choice in Britain and France respectively. Eventually this developed into a political policy as the new united Germany was seen as a potential threat. Louis Blériot, for example, crossed the Channel in an aeroplane in 1909. Many saw this as symbolic of the connection between the two countries. This period in the first decade of the 20th century became known as the Entente Cordiale, and continued in spirit until the 1940s. The signing of the Entente Cordiale also marked the end of almost a millennium of intermittent conflict between the two nations and their predecessor states, and the formalisation of the peaceful co-existence that had existed since the end of the Napoleonic Wars in 1815. Up to 1940, relations between Britain and France were closer than those between Britain and the US. This also started the beginning of the French and British Special Relationship. After 1907 the British fleet was built up to stay far ahead of Germany. However Britain nor France committed itself to entering a war if Germany attacked the other.

In 1904, Paris and London agreed that Britain would establish a protectorate over Egypt, and France would do the same over Morocco. Germany objected, and the conference at Algeciras in 1906 settled the issue as Germany was outmaneuvered.

First World War

Britain tried to stay neutral as the First World War opened in summer 1914, as France joined in to help its ally Russia according to its treaty obligations. Britain had no relevant treaty obligations except one to keep Belgium neutral, and was not in close touch with the French leaders. Britain entered when the German army invaded neutral Belgium (on its way to attack Paris); that was intolerable. It joined France, sending a small expeditionary force to fight on the Western Front, later reinforced by volunteers and conscripts to form a large army.

There was close co-operation between the British and French forces. French Commander-in-Chief Joseph Joffre worked to coordinate Allied military operations and to mount a combined Anglo-French offensive on the Western Front. The result was the great Battle of the Somme in 1916 with massive casualties on both sides and only limited gains. Paul Painlevé took important decisions during 1917 as France's war minister and then, for nine weeks,  premier. With some reservations, he promoted the Nivelle Offensive—which failed badly and drove the French Army to mutiny. The disasters at Passchendaele hurt Britain, its army and civil-military relations. The positive result was the decision to form the Supreme War Council that led eventually to unity of Allied command.

Unable to advance against the combined primary alliance powers of the British, French, and later American forces as well as the blockade preventing shipping reaching German controlled North Sea seaports, the Germans eventually sued for peace after four years of heavy fighting.

Treaty of Versailles

Following the war, at the Treaty of Versailles the British and French worked closely with the Americans to dominate the main decisions. Both were also keen to protect and expand their empires, in the face of calls for self-determination. On a visit to London, French leader Georges Clemenceau was hailed by the British crowds. Lloyd George was given a similar reception in Paris.

Lloyd George worked hard to moderate French demands for revenge.  Clemenceau wanted terms to cripple Germany's war potential that were too harsh for Wilson and Lloyd George.  A compromise was reached whereby Clemenceau softened his terms and the U.S. and Britain promised a Security Treaty that would guarantee armed intervention by both if Germany invaded France.  The British ratified the treaty on condition the U.S. ratified.  in the United States Senate, the Republicans were supportive, but Wilson insisted this security treaty be closely tied to the overall Versailles Treaty, and Republicans refused and so it never came to a vote in the Senate. Thus there was no treaty at all to help defend France.

Britain soon had to moderate French policy toward Germany, as in the Locarno Treaties. Under Prime Minister Ramsay MacDonald in 1923–24 Britain took the lead in getting France to accept the American solution through the Dawes Plan and the Young Plan, whereby Germany paid its reparations using money borrowed from New York banks.

1920s
Both states joined the League of Nations, and both signed agreements of defence of several countries, most significantly Poland. The Treaty of Sèvres split the Middle East between the two states, in the form of mandates. However the outlook of the nations were different during the inter-war years; while France saw itself inherently as a European power, Britain enjoyed close relationships with Australia, Canada and New Zealand and supported the idea of imperial free trade, a form of protectionism that would have seen large tariffs placed on goods from France.

In the 1920s, financial instability was a major problem for France, and other nations as well. it was vulnerable to short-term concerted action by banks and financial institutions by heavy selling or buying, in the financial crisis could weaken governments, and be used as a diplomatic threat. Premier and Finance Minister Raymond Poincaré decided to stabilise the franc to protect against political currency manipulation by Germany and Britain. His solution in 1926 was a return to a fixed parity against gold. France was not able to turn the tables and use short-term financial advantage as leverage against Britain on important policy matters.

In general, France and Britain were aligned in their position on major issues. A key reason was the Francophile position of Foreign Minister Austen Chamberlain, and the ambassador to Paris the Marquess of Crewe (1922–28). They promoted a pro-French policy regarding French security and disarmament policy, the later stages of the Ruhr crisis, the implementation of the Geneva Protocol, the Treaty of Locarno and the origins of the Kellogg-Briand Pact. The high point of cooperation came with the Treaty of Locarno in 1925, which brought Germany into good terms with France and Britain. However, relations with France became increasingly tense because Chamberlain grew annoyed that foreign minister Aristide Briand's diplomatic agenda did not have at its heart a reinvigorated Entente Cordiale.

Furthermore, Britain thought disarmament was the key to peace but France disagreed because of its profound fear of German militarism. London decided Paris really sought military dominance of Europe. Before 1933, most Britons saw France, not Germany, as the chief threat to peace and harmony in Europe. France did not suffer as severe an economic recession, and was the strongest military power, but still it refused British overtures for disarmament. Anthony Powell, in his A Dance to the Music of Time, said that to be anti-French and pro-German in the 1920s was considered the height of progressive sophistication.

Appeasement of Germany

In the 1930s, Britain and France coordinated their policies toward the dictatorships of Mussolini's Italy and Hitler's Germany. However, public opinion did not support going to war again, so the diplomats sought diplomatic solutions, but none worked. Efforts to use the League of Nations to apply sanctions against Italy for its invasion of Ethiopia failed. France supported the "Little Entente" of Czechoslovakia, Romania, and Yugoslavia. It proved much too weak to deter Germany.

The Anglo-German Naval Agreement was signed between Britain and Nazi Germany in 1935, allowing Hitler to reinforce his navy. It was regarded by the French as the ruining of the anti-Hitlerian Stresa front.  Britain and France collaborated closely especially in the late 1930s regarding Germany, based on informal promises with no written treaty. Efforts were made to negotiate a treaty but they failed in 1936, underscoring French weakness.

In the years leading up to World War II, both countries followed a similar diplomatic path of appeasement of Germany. As Nazi intentions became clear, France pushed for a harder line but the British demurred, believing diplomacy could solve the disputes. The result was the Munich Agreement of 1938 that gave Germany control of parts of Czechoslovakia settled by Germans. In early 1939, Germany took over all of Czechoslovakia and began threatening Poland. Appeasement had failed, and both Britain and France raced to catch up with Germany in weaponry.

Second World War

After guaranteeing the independence of Poland, both declared war on Germany on the same day, 3 September 1939, after the Germans ignored an ultimatum to withdraw from the country. When Germany began its attack on France in 1940, British troops and French troops again fought side by side. Eventually, after the Germans came through the Ardennes, it became more possible that France would not be able to fend off the German attack. The final bond between the two nations was so strong that members of the British cabinet had proposed a temporary union of the two countries for the sake of morale: the plan was drawn up by Jean Monnet, who later created the Common Market. The idea was not popular with a majority on either side, and the French government felt that, in the circumstances, the plan for union would reduce France to the level of a British Dominion. When London ordered the withdrawal of the British Expeditionary Force from France without telling French and Belgian forces and then refused to provide France with further reinforcements of aircraft the proposal was definitively turned down. Later The Free French resistance, led by Charles de Gaulle, were formed in London, after de Gaulle gave his famous 'Appeal of 18 June', broadcast by the BBC. De Gaulle declared himself to be the head of the one and only true government of France, and gathered the Free French Forces around him.

War against Vichy France
After the preemptive destruction of a large part of the French fleet by the British at Mers-el-Kebir (3 July 1940), as well as a similar attack on French ships in Oran on the grounds that they might fall into German hands, there was nationwide anti-British indignation and a long-lasting feeling of betrayal in France. In southern France a collaborative government known as Vichy France was set up on 10 July. It was officially neutral, but metropolitan France came increasingly under German control. The Vichy government controlled Syria, Madagascar, and French North Africa and French troops and naval forces therein. Eventually, several important French ships joined the Free French Forces.

One by one de Gaulle took control of the French colonies, beginning with central Africa in autumn`1940, and gained recognition from Britain but not the United States. An Anglo-Free French attack on Vichy territory was repulsed at the Battle of Dakar in September 1940. Washington maintained diplomatic relations with Vichy (until October 1942) and avoided recognition of de Gaulle. Churchill, caught between the U.S. and de Gaulle, tried to find a compromise.

From 1941, British Empire and Commonwealth forces invaded Vichy controlled territory in Africa, the Indian Ocean and the Middle East. The first began in 1941 during the campaign against Syria and the Lebanon assisted with Free French troops. In two months of bitter fighting the region was seized and then put under Free French control. Around the same time after the Italian defeat in East Africa, Vichy controlled French Somaliland subsequently became blockaded by British and Free French forces. In a bloodless invasion the colony fell in mid 1942. In May 1942, the Vichy controlled island of Madagascar was invaded. In a seven-month campaign the island was seized by British Empire forces. Finally in the latter half of 1942, the British with the help of US forces took part in the successful invasion of French North Africa in Operation Torch. Most Vichy forces switched sides afterwards to help the allied cause during the Tunisian Campaign fighting as part of the British First Army.

Levant Crisis

Following D-Day, relations between the two peoples were at a high, as the British were greeted as liberators and remained so till the surrender of Germany in May 1945. At the end of that month, however, French troops, with their continued occupation of Syria, had tried to quell nationalist protests there. With heavy Syrian civilian casualties reported, Churchill demanded a ceasefire. With none forthcoming, he ordered British forces into Syria from Jordan. When they reached Damascus in June, the French were then escorted and confined to their barracks at gunpoint. That became known as the Levant Crisis and almost brought Britain and France to the point of conflict. De Gaulle raged against 'Churchill's ultimatum' and reluctantly arranged a ceasefire. Syria gained independence the following year and France labelled British measures as a 'stab in the back'.

1945–1956

The UK and France nevertheless became close as both feared the Americans would withdraw from Europe leaving them vulnerable to the Soviet Union's expanding communist bloc. The UK was successful in strongly advocating that France be given a zone of occupied Germany. Both states were amongst the five Permanent Members of the new UN Security Council, where they commonly collaborated. However, France was bitter when the United States and Britain refused to share atomic secrets with it. An American operation to use air strikes (including the potential use of tactical nuclear weapons) during the climax of the Battle of Dien Bien Phu in May 1954 was cancelled because of opposition by the British. The upshot was France developed its own nuclear weapons and delivery systems.

The Cold War began in 1947, as the United States, with strong British support, announced the Truman Doctrine to contain Communist expansion and provided military and economic aid to Greece and Turkey.  Despite its large pro-Soviet Communist Party, France joined the Allies. The first move was the Franco-British alliance realised in the Dunkirk Treaty in March 1947.

Suez Crisis

In 1956, the Suez Canal, previously owned by an Anglo-French company, was nationalised by the Egyptian government. The British and the French were both strongly committed to taking the canal back by force. President Eisenhower and the Soviet Union demanded there be no invasion and both imposed heavy pressure to reverse the invasion when it came.  The relations between Britain and France were not entirely harmonious, as the French did not inform the British about the involvement of Israel until very close to the commencement of military operations. The failure in Suez convinced Paris it needed its own nuclear weapons.

Common Market

Immediately after the Suez crisis Anglo-French relations started to sour again, and only since the last decades of the 20th century have they improved towards the peak they achieved between 1900 and 1940.

Shortly after 1956, France, West Germany, Italy, Belgium, the Netherlands and Luxembourg formed what would become the European Economic Community and later the European Union, but rejected British requests for membership. In particular, President Charles de Gaulle's attempts to exclude the British from European affairs during France's early Fifth Republic are now seen by many in Britain as a betrayal of the strong bond between the countries, and Anthony Eden's exclusion of France from the Commonwealth is seen in a similar light in France. The French partly feared that were the British to join the EEC they would attempt to dominate it.

Over the years, the UK and France have often taken diverging courses within the European Community. British policy has favoured an expansion of the Community and free trade while France has advocated a closer political union and restricting membership of the Community to a core of Western European states.

De Gaulle

In 1958, with France mired in a seemingly unwinnable war in Algeria, de Gaulle returned to power in France. He created the Fifth French Republic, ending the post-war parliamentary system and replacing it with a strong Presidency, which became dominated by his followers—the Gaullists. De Gaulle made ambitious changes to French foreign policy—first ending the war in Algeria, and then withdrawing France from the NATO command structure. The latter move was primarily symbolic, but NATO headquarters moved to Brussels and French generals had a much lesser role.

French policy blocking British entry into the European Economic Community (EEC) was primarily motivated by political rather than economic considerations. In 1967, as in 1961–63, de Gaulle was determined to preserve France's dominance within the EEC, which was the foundation of the nation's international stature. His policy was to preserve the Community of Six while barring Britain. Although France succeeded in excluding Britain in the short term, in the longer term the French had to adjust their stance on enlargement in order to retain influence. De Gaulle feared that letting Britain into the European Community would open the way for Anglo-Saxon (i.e., US and UK) influence to overwhelm the France-West Germany coalition that was now dominant. On 14 January 1963, de Gaulle announced that France would veto Britain's entry into the Common Market.

Since 1969

When de Gaulle resigned in 1969, a new French government under Georges Pompidou was prepared to open a more friendly dialogue with Britain. He felt that in the economic crises of the 1970s Europe needed Britain. Pompidou welcomed British membership of the EEC, opening the way for the United Kingdom to join it in 1973.

The two countries' relationship was strained significantly in the lead-up to the 2003 War in Iraq. Britain and its American ally strongly advocated the use of force to remove Saddam Hussein, while France (with China, Russia, and other nations) strongly opposed such action, with French President Jacques Chirac threatening to veto any resolution proposed to the UN Security Council. However, despite such differences Chirac and then British Prime Minister Tony Blair maintained a fairly close relationship during their years in office even after the Iraq War started. Both states asserted the importance of the Entente Cordiale alliance, and the role it had played during the 20th century.

Sarkozy presidency
Following his election in 2007, President Nicolas Sarkozy attempted to forge closer relations between France and the United Kingdom: in March 2008, Prime Minister Gordon Brown said that "there has never been greater cooperation between France and Britain as there is now". Sarkozy also urged both countries to "overcome our long-standing rivalries and build together a future that will be stronger because we will be together". He also said "If we want to change Europe my dear British friends—and we Frenchmen do wish to change Europe—we need you inside Europe to help us do so, not standing on the outside." On 26 March 2008, Sarkozy had the privilege of giving a speech to both British Houses of Parliament, where he called for a "brotherhood" between the two countries and stated that "France will never forget Britain's war sacrifice" during World War II.

In March 2008, Sarkozy made a state visit to Britain, promising closer cooperation between the two countries' governments in the future.

Hollande presidency

The final months towards the end of François Hollande's tenure as president saw the UK vote to leave the EU. His response to the result was "I profoundly regret this decision for the United Kingdom and for Europe, but the choice is theirs and we have to respect it."

The then-Economy Minister and current President Emmanuel Macron accused the UK of taking the EU "hostage" with a referendum called to solve a domestic political problem of eurosceptics and that "the failure of the British government [has opened up] the possibility of the crumbling of Europe."

In contrast, the vote was welcomed by Eurosceptic political leaders and presidential candidates Marine Le Pen and Nicolas Dupont-Aignan as a victory for "freedom".

Macron presidency
In the aftermath of Brexit, fishing disputes, notably the 2021 Jersey dispute, have caused turbulence in relations between the two countries.

In May 2021, France threatened to cut off electricity to the British Channel Island of Jersey in a fight over post-Brexit fishing rights.

In August 2021, Tensions emerged between the countries after the announcement of the AUKUS agreement between the United Kingdom, the United States, and Australia.

In October 2021, the UK Foreign Office summoned the French ambassador over "threats" made by French officials against Jersey. In November, France threatened to ban UK fishing vessels from French ports.

In November 2021, relations became more stagnant after the French Foreign Minister Jean-Yves Le Drian claimed that British Prime Minister Boris Johnson is a "populist who uses all elements at his disposal to blame others for problems he faces internally". A few days later, after 27 migrants drowned in the English Channel, Prime Minister Boris Johnson tweeted a letter that was sent to French President Emmanuel Macron which had irritated him due to the letter being made public on Twitter. The French Interior Minister Gérald Darmanin cancelled a proposed meeting with British Home Secretary Priti Patel over the migrant crossings due to the row over the letter.

On March 6, 2022, French Interior Minister Gerald Darmanin urged Britain to do more to assist Ukrainian refugees trapped in the French port of Calais, claiming that British officials were turning them away owing to a lack of permits or papers.

On August 25, 2022, Liz Truss, the expected candidate for Prime Minister from the Conservative Party was asked if she sees Macron as a friend or a rival. Truss hesitated and replied that "The jury's out. But if I become prime minister, I'll judge him on deeds, not words".
This answer brought a sharp reaction on behalf of the Labour Party when David Lammy, who serves as the party's foreign affairs spokesman, said in response that "the fact that she chose to unnecessarily insult one of our closest allies shows a lack of judgment, and that lack of capacity is a terrible and worrying thing."
Macron himself responded that "the British people, Britain itself, are a friendly, strong nation and our ally, regardless of the identity of its leaders, and sometimes despite its leaders or the small mistakes they make in their attempt to impress the audience". He added: "If we, France and Britain, are unable to say whether we are friends or enemies - and the term is not neutral - then we are on the way to serious problems. If I were to be asked this question, I would not hesitate for a second - Britain is France's friend."

Defence cooperation 
The two nations have a post WWII record of working together on international security measures, as was seen in the Suez Crisis and Falklands War. In her 2020 book, Johns Hopkins University SAIS political scientist Alice Pannier writes that there is a growing "special relationship" between France and the UK in terms of defence cooperation.

On 2 November 2010, France and the UK signed two defence co-operation treaties. They provide for the sharing of aircraft carriers, a 10,000-strong joint reaction force, a common nuclear simulation centre in France, a common nuclear research centre in the UK, sharing air-refuelling tankers and joint training.

Their post-colonial entanglements have given them a more outward focus than the other countries of Europe, leading them to work together on issues such as the Libyan Civil War.

Commerce
France is the United Kingdom's third-biggest export market after the United States and Germany. Exports to France rose 14.3% from £16.542 billion in 2010 to £18.905 billion in 2011, overtaking exports to the Netherlands. Over the same period, French exports to Britain rose 5.5% from £18.133 billion to £19.138 billion.

The British Foreign & Commonwealth Office estimates that 19.3 million British citizens, roughly a third of the entire population, visit France each year. In 2012, the French were the biggest visitors to the UK (12%, 3,787,000) and the second-biggest tourist spenders in Britain (8%, £1.513 billion).

Education 
The Entente Cordiale Scholarship scheme is a selective Franco-British scholarship scheme which was announced on 30 October 1995 by British Prime Minister John Major and French President Jacques Chirac at an Anglo-French summit in London.

It provides funding for British and French students to study for one academic year on the other side of the Channel. The scheme is administered by the French embassy in London for British students, and by the British Council in France and the UK embassy in Paris for French students. Funding is provided by the private sector and foundations.
The scheme aims to favour mutual understanding and to promote exchanges between the British and French leaders of tomorrow.

The programme was initiated by Sir Christopher Mallaby, British ambassador to France between 1993 and 1996.

The sciences

The Concorde supersonic commercial aircraft was developed under an international treaty between the UK and France in 1962, and commenced flying in 1969.   It was a technological success but a financial disaster and was closed down after a runway crash in 2003.

Arts and culture

In general, France is regarded with favour by Britain in regard to its high culture and is seen as an ideal holiday destination, whilst France sees Britain as a major trading partner. Both countries are famously contemptuous of each other's cooking, many French claiming all British food is bland and boring, whilst many British claim that French food is inedible. Much of the apparent disdain for French food and culture in Britain takes the form of self-effacing humour, and British comedy often uses French culture as the butt of its jokes. Whether this is representative of true opinion or not is open to debate. Sexual euphemisms with no link to France, such as French kissing, or French letter for a condom, are used in British English slang. While in French slang, the term le vice anglais refers to either BDSM or homosexuality.

French classical music has always been popular in Britain. British popular music is in turn popular in France. English literature, in particular the works of Agatha Christie and William Shakespeare, has been immensely popular in France. French artist Eugène Delacroix based many of his paintings on scenes from Shakespeare's plays. In turn, French writers such as Molière, Voltaire and Victor Hugo have been translated numerous times into English. In general, most of the more popular books in either language are translated into the other.

Language

The first foreign language most commonly taught in schools in Britain is French, and the first foreign language most commonly taught in schools in France is English; those are also the languages perceived as "most useful to learn" in both countries. Queen Elizabeth II of the UK was fluent in French and did not require an interpreter when travelling to French-language countries. French is a substantial minority language and immigrant language in the United Kingdom, with over 100,000 French-born people in the UK. According to a 2006 European Commission report, 23% of UK residents are able to carry on a conversation in French and 39% of French residents are able to carry on a conversation in English. French is also an official language in both Jersey and Guernsey. Both use French to some degree, mostly in an administrative or ceremonial capacity. Jersey Legal French is the standardised variety used in Jersey. However, Norman (in its local forms, Guernésiais and Jèrriais) is the historical vernacular of the islands.

Both languages have influenced each other throughout the years. According to different sources, more than 50% of all English words have a French origin, and today many French expressions have entered the English language as well. The term Franglais, a portmanteau combining the French words "français" and "anglais", refers to the combination of French and English (mostly in the UK) or the use of English words and nouns of Anglo-Saxon roots in French (in France).

Modern and Middle English reflect a mixture of Oïl and Old English lexicons after the Norman Conquest of England in 1066, when a Norman-speaking aristocracy took control of a population whose mother tongue was Germanic in origin. Due to the intertwined histories of England and continental possessions of the English Crown, many formal and legal words in Modern English have French roots. For example, buy and sell are of Germanic origin, while purchase and vend are from Old French.

Sports

In the sport of rugby union there is a rivalry between England and France. Both countries compete in the Six Nations Championship and the Rugby World Cup. England has the edge in both tournaments, having the most outright wins in the Six Nations (and its previous version the Five Nations), and most recently knocking the French team out of the 2003 and 2007 World Cups at the semi-final stage, although France knocked England out of the 2011 Rugby World Cup with a convincing score in their quarter final match. Though rugby is originally a British sport, French rugby has developed to such an extent that the English and French teams are now stiff competitors, with neither side greatly superior to the other. While English influences spread rugby union at an early stage to Scotland, Wales and Ireland, as well as the Commonwealth realms, French influence spread the sport outside the commonwealth, to Italy, Argentina, Romania and Georgia.

The influence of French players and coaches on British football has been increasing in recent years and is often cited as an example of Anglo-French cooperation. In particular the Premier League club Arsenal has become known for its Anglo-French connection due to a heavy influx of French players since the advent of French manager Arsène Wenger in 1996. In March 2008 their Emirates stadium was chosen as the venue for a meeting during a state visit by the French President precisely for this reason.

Many people blamed the then French President Jacques Chirac for contributing to Paris' loss to London in its bid for the 2012 Summer Olympics after he made derogatory remarks about British cuisine and saying that "only Finnish food is worse". The IOC committee which would ultimately decide to give the games to London (by four votes) had two members from Finland.

Transport

Ferries
The busiest seaway in the world, the English Channel, connects ports in Great Britain such as Dover, Newhaven, Poole, Weymouth, Portsmouth and Plymouth to ports such as Roscoff, Calais, Boulogne, Dunkerque, Dieppe, Cherbourg-Octeville, Caen, St Malo and Le Havre in mainland France. Companies such as Brittany Ferries, P&O Ferries, DFDS Seaways and LD Lines operate ferry services across the Channel.

In addition, there are ferries across the Anguilla Channel between Blowing Point, Anguilla (a British Overseas Territory) and Marigot, Saint Martin (an overseas collectivity of France).

Channel Tunnel

The Channel Tunnel (also referred to as the Chunnel) is a 50.5-kilometre (31.4 mi) undersea rail tunnel (linking Folkestone, Kent, in the United Kingdom with Coquelles, Pas-de-Calais, near the city of Calais in northern France) beneath the English Channel at the Strait of Dover. Ideas for a cross-Channel fixed link appeared as early as 1802, but British political and press pressure over compromised national security stalled attempts to construct a tunnel. The eventual successful project, organised by Eurotunnel, began construction in 1988 and was opened by British Queen Elizabeth II and French President François Mitterrand in a ceremony held in Calais on 6 May 1994. The same year the American Society of Civil Engineers elected the Channel Tunnel as one of the seven modern Wonders of the World.

Flights
11,675,910 passengers in 2008 travelled on flights between the United Kingdom and France.

Twin cities and towns
France has the most twin cities and towns in the United Kingdom.

  Aberdeen and  Clermont-Ferrand, Puy-de-Dôme
  Andover, Hampshire and  Redon, Ille-et-Vilaine
  Angmering, West Sussex and  Ouistreham, Calvados
  Aylesbury, Buckinghamshire and  Bourg-en-Bresse, Ain
  Aylsham, Norfolk and  La Chaussée-Saint-Victor, Loir-et-Cher
  Barnet, London and  Le Raincy, Seine-Saint-Denis
  Barrow upon Soar, Leicestershire and  Marans, Charente-Maritime
  Basildon, Essex and Meaux, Seine-et-Marne
  Basingstoke, Hampshire and  Alençon, Orne
  Bath, Somerset and  Aix-en-Provence, Bouches-du-Rhône
  Beaminster, Dorset and  Saint-James, Manche
  Beccles, Suffolk and  Petit-Couronne, Seine-Maritime
  Birmingham, West Midlands and  Lyon, Metropolitan Lyon
  Blandford Forum, Dorset and  Mortain, Manche
  Bolton, Greater Manchester and  Le Mans, Sarthe
  Bridport, Dorset and  Saint-Vaast-la-Hougue, Manche
  Bristol, City of Bristol and  Bordeaux, Gironde
  Bury, Greater Manchester and  Angoulême, Charente
  Camberley, Surrey and  Sucy-en-Brie, Val-de-Marne
  Canterbury, Kent and  Reims, Marne
  Cardiff and  Nantes, Loire-Atlantique
  Chelmsford, Essex and  Annonay, Ardèche
  Cheltenham, Gloucestershire and  Annecy, Haute-Savoie
  Chester, Cheshire and  Sens, Yonne
  Chichester, West Sussex and  Chartres, Eure-et-Loir
  Chippenham, Wiltshire and  La Flèche, Sarthe
  Chipping Ongar, Essex and  Cerizay, Deux-Sèvres
  Christchurch, Dorset and  Saint-Lô, Manche
  Cockermouth, Cumbria and  Marvejols, Lozère
  Coleraine and  La Roche Sur Yon
  Colchester, Essex and  Avignon, Vaucluse
  Cowes, Isle of Wight and  Deauville, Calvados
  Crewe, Cheshire and  Mâcon, Saône-et-Loire
  Devizes, Wiltshire and  Mayenne, Pays de la Loire
  Dorchester, Dorset and  Bayeux, Calvados
  Dover, Kent and  Calais, Pas-de-Calais
  Droylsden, Tameside and  Villemomble, Seine-Saint-Denis
  Dukinfield, Cheshire and  Champagnole, Jura
  Dundee and  Orléans, Loiret
  Ealing, London and  Marcq-en-Barœul, Nord
  East Preston, West Sussex and  Brou, Eure-et-Loir
  Edinburgh and  Nice, Alpes-Maritimes
  Elmbridge, Surrey and  Rueil-Malmaison, Hauts-de-Seine
  Epsom, Surrey and  Chantilly, Oise
  Exeter, Devon and  Rennes, Ille-et-Vilaine
  Exmouth, Devon and  Dinan, Côtes-d'Armor
  Fareham, Hampshire, and  Vannes, Morbihan
  Ferndown, Dorset and  Segré, Maine-et-Loire
  Farnborough, Hampshire and  Meudon, Hauts-de-Seine
  Folkestone, Kent and  Boulogne-sur-Mer, Pas-de-Calais
  Glasgow and  Marseille, Bouches-du-Rhône
  Gloucester, Gloucestershire and  Metz, Moselle
  Godalming, Surrey and  Joigny, Yonne
  Hailsham, East Sussex and  Gournay-en-Bray, Seine-Maritime
  Hammersmith and Fulham, London and  Boulogne-Billancourt, Hauts-de-Seine
  Harrogate, Yorkshire and  Luchon, Haute-Garonne
  Harrold, Bedfordshire and  Sainte-Pazanne, Loire-Atlantique
  Harrow, London and  Douai, Nord
  Hastings, East Sussex and  Béthune, Pas-de-Calais
  Havering, London and  Hesdin, Pas-de-Calais
  Hereford, Herefordshire and  Vierzon, Cher
  Herne Bay, Kent and  Wimereux, Pas-de-Calais
  Hillingdon, London and  Mantes-la-Jolie, Yvelines
  Horsham, West Sussex and  Saint-Maixent-l'Ecole, Deux-Sèvres
  Hounslow, London and  Issy-les-Moulineaux, Hauts-de-Seine
  Inverness and  Saint-Valery-en-Caux, Seine-Maritime
  Ipswich, Suffolk and  Arras, Pas-de-Calais
  Kensington and Chelsea, London and  Cannes, Alpes-Maritimes
  Leeds, Yorkshire and  Lille, Nord
  Leicester and  Strasbourg, Bas-Rhin
  Lewisham, London and  Antony, Hauts-de-Seine
  Lichfield, Staffordshire and  Sainte-Foy-lès-Lyon, Lyon Metropolis
  Littlehampton, West Sussex and  Chennevières-sur-Marne, Val-de-Marne
  Llandeilo, Carmarthenshire and  Le Conquet, Finistère
  Llanelli, Carmarthenshire and  Agen, Lot-et-Garonne
  London and  Paris
  Loughborough, Leicestershire and  Épinal, Vosges
  Maidenhead, Berkshire and  Saint-Cloud, Hauts-de-Seine
  Maidstone, Kent and  Beauvais, Oise
  Merthyr Tydfil, Merthyr Tydfil and  Clichy, Hauts-de-Seine
  Middlesbrough, Yorkshire and  Dunkirk, Nord
  Newcastle upon Tyne and  Nancy, Meurthe-et-Moselle
  Newhaven, East Sussex and  La Chapelle-Saint-Mesmin, Loiret
  Northampton, Northamptonshire and  Poitiers, Vienne
  Norwich, Norfolk and  Rouen, Seine-Maritime
  Oxford, Oxfordshire and  Grenoble, Isère
  Perth and  Cognac, Charente
  Plymouth, Devon and  Brest, Finistère
  Portsmouth, Hampshire and  Caen, Calvados
  Poole, Dorset and  Cherbourg-Octeville, Manche
  Preston, Lancashire and  Nîmes, Gard
  Ramsgate, Kent and  Conflans-Sainte-Honorine, Yvelines
  Reigate, Surrey and  Brunoy, Essonne
  Richmond upon Thames, London and  Fontainebleau, Seine-et-Marne
  Rochdale, Greater Manchester and  Tourcoing, Nord
  Rotherham, Yorkshire and  Saint-Quentin, Aisne
  Royston, Hertfordshire and  La Loupe, Eure-et-Loir
  Borough of Runnymede, Surrey and  Joinville-le-Pont, Val-de-Marne
  Salford, Greater Manchester and  Clermont-Ferrand, Puy-de-Dôme
  Salisbury, Wiltshire and  Saintes, Charente-Maritime
  Sawbridgeworth, Hertfordshire and  Bry-sur-Marne, Val-de-Marne
  Selby, Yorkshire and  Carentan, Manche
  Sherborne, Dorset and  Granville, Manche
  City of Southampton, Hampshire and  Le Havre, Seine-Maritime
  Southborough, Kent and  Lambersart, Nord
  Spelthorne, Surrey and  Melun, Seine-et-Marne
  St Albans, Hertfordshire and  Nevers, Nièvre
  Stalybridge, Tameside and  Armentières, Nord
  Stevenage, Hertfordshire and  Autun, Saône-et-Loire
  Stockport, Greater Manchester and  Béziers, Hérault
  Sturminster Newton, Dorset and  Montebourg, Manche
  Sunderland, Tyne & Wear and  Saint-Nazaire, Loire-Atlantique
  Sutton, London and  Gagny, Seine-Saint-Denis
  Taunton, Somerset and  Lisieux, Calvados
  Truro, Cornwall and  Morlaix, Finistère
  Vale of White Horse, Oxfordshire and  Colmar, Haut-Rhin
  Verwood, Dorset and  Champtoceaux, Maine-et-Loire
  Ware, Hertfordshire and  Cormeilles-en-Parisis, Val d'Oise
  Wareham, Dorset and  Conches-en-Ouche, Eure
  Watford, Hertfordshire and  Nanterre, Hauts-de-Seine
  Wellington, Shropshire and  Châtenay-Malabry, Hauts-de-Seine
  Wembury, Devonshire and  Locmaria-Plouzané, Finistère
  Wetherby, Yorkshire and  Privas, Ardèche
  Weymouth and Portland, Dorset and  Louviers, Eure
  Whitstable, Kent and  Dainville, Pas-de-Calais
  Wigan, Greater Manchester and  Angers, Maine-et-Loire
  Wimborne Minster, Dorset and  Valognes, Manche
  Winchester, Hampshire and  Laon, Aisne
  Windsor, Berkshire and  Neuilly-sur-Seine, Hauts-de-Seine
  Metropolitan Borough of Wirral, Merseyside and  Lorient, Morbihan and Gennevilliers, Hauts-de-Seine
  Woking, Surrey and  Le Plessis-Robinson, Hauts-de-Seine
  York, Yorkshire and  Dijon, Côte-d'Or
There are lists of twinnings (including those to towns in other countries) at List of twin towns and sister cities in France and at List of twin towns and sister cities in the United Kingdom.

Resident diplomatic missions 
 France has an embassy in London and a consulate-general in Edinburgh.
 United Kingdom has an embassy in Paris and consulates in Bordeaux and Marseille and a trade office in Lyon.

See also
 Angevin Empire
 Anglo-French War (disambiguation)
 History of French foreign relations
 Auld Alliance, between France and Scotland
 Common Security and Defence Policy
 Embassy of the United Kingdom, Paris
 English claims to the French throne
 Entente cordiale
 Entente Cordiale Scholarships
 Franco-British Union
 French migration to the United Kingdom
 Hundred Years' War
 List of British French
 List of ambassadors from the Kingdom of England to France (up to 1707)
 List of ambassadors of Great Britain to France (from 1707 to 1800).
 List of ambassadors of the United Kingdom to France (since 1800)
 List of Ambassadors of France to the United Kingdom (since 1800)
 Military history of England
 Military history of France
 Perfidious Albion
 Second Hundred Years' War
 SEPECAT Jaguar
 Triple Entente
 1983 France–United Kingdom Maritime Boundary Convention
 1996 France–United Kingdom Maritime Delimitation Agreements
 EU–UK relations
 France–UK border

References

Further reading
 Chassaigne, Philippe, and Michael Dockrill, eds. Anglo-French Relations 1898-1998: From Fashoda to Jospin (Springer, 2001).
 Gibson, Robert. The Best of Enemies: Anglo-French Relations Since the Norman Conquest (2nd ed. 2011) major scholarly study excerpt and text search
 Horne, Alistair, Friend or Foe: An Anglo-Saxon History of France (Weidenfeld & Nicolson, 2005).
 Johnson, Douglas, et al.  Britain and France: Ten Centuries (1980) table of contents
 Tombs, Robert and Isabelle Tombs. That Sweet Enemy: Britain and France: The History of a Love-Hate Relationship (2008) 1688 to present online

To 1918
 Acomb, Frances Dorothy. Anglophobia in France, 1763–1789: an essay in the history of constitutionalism and nationalism (Duke UP, 1950).
 Andrew, Christopher, "France and the Making of the Entente Cordiale" Historical Journal 10#1 (1967), pp 89–105.
 Andrews, Stuart. The British periodical press and the French Revolution, 1789–99 (Macmillan, 2000)
 Baer, Werner. "The Promoting and the Financing of the Suez Canal" Business History Review (1956) 30#4 pp. 361–381 online
 Baugh, Daniel A. The Global Seven Years' War, 1754–1763: Britain and France in a Great Power Contest (Longman, 2011)
 Black, Jeremy. Natural and Necessary Enemies: Anglo-French Relations in the Eighteenth Century (1986).
 Blockley, John Edward. "Cross Channel Reflections: French Perceptions of Britain from Fashoda to the Boer War" (PhD dissertation Queen Mary University of London, 2015). online
 Brogan, D. W. France under the Republic: The Development of Modern France (1870–1939) (1941), Scholarly history by a British expert; 764pp. online
 Brown, David. "Palmerston and Anglo–French Relations, 1846–1865." Diplomacy and Statecraft 17.4 (2006): 675–692.
 Carroll, E. Malcolm. French Public Opinion and Foreign Affairs, 1870–1914 (1931) online
 Cameron-Ash, M. Lying for the Admiralty: Captain Cook's Endeavour Voyage, 2018, Rosenberg Publishing, Sydney,
 Clark, Christopher. The sleepwalkers: how Europe went to war in 1914 (2012)
 Crouzet, François. Britain Ascendant. Comparative Studies in Franco-British Economic History (Cambridge UP, 1990).
 Davis, Richard. Anglo-French relations before the Second World War: appeasement and crisis (Springer, 2001).
 Dickinson, Harry Thomas, ed. Britain and the French Revolution, 1789–1815 (1989).
 Golicz, Roman. "Napoleon III, Lord Palmerston and the Entente Cordiale". History Today 50#12 (December 2000): 10–17
 Gifford, Prosser and William Roger Louis. France and Britain in Africa: Imperial Rivalry and Colonial Rule (1971)
 Harris, John R. Industrial Espionage and Technology Transfer: Britain and France in the 18th Century (Taylor & Francis, 2017).
 Harvey, Robert, The War of Wars: The Great European Conflict 1793–1815 (Robinson, 2007).
 Horn, David Bayne. Great Britain and Europe in the eighteenth century (1967) pp 22–85.
 Jacobs, Wilbur R. Diplomacy and Indian gifts: Anglo-French rivalry along the Ohio and Northwest frontiers, 1748–1763 (1950)
 Jones, Colin. Britain and Revolutionary France: Conflict, Subversion, and Propaganda (1983); 96pp
 Keiger, J.F.V. France and the World since 1870 (2001)
 
 Kennan, George Frost. The fateful alliance: France, Russia, and the coming of the First World War (1984) ; covers 1890 to 1894.
 Langer, William. European Alliances and Alignments 1870–1890 (1950); advanced diplomatic history
 Langer, William. The Diplomacy of Imperialism 1890–1902 (1950); advanced diplomatic history
 McLynn, Frank, 1759: The Year Britain Became Master of the World (Pimlico, 2005).
 MacMillan, Margaret.  The War That Ended Peace: The Road to 1914  (2014) pp 142–71. online
 Mayne, Richard, Douglas Johnson, and Robert Tombs, eds. Cross Channel Currents 100 Years of the Entente Cordiale (Routledge: 2004),
 Newman, Gerald. "Anti-French Propaganda and British Liberal Nationalism in the Early Nineteenth Century: Suggestions Toward a General Interpretation." Victorian Studies (1975): 385–418. 
 Otte, T. G. "From 'War-in-Sight' to Nearly War: Anglo–French Relations in the Age of High Imperialism, 1875–1898." Diplomacy and Statecraft (2006) 17#4 pp: 693–714.
 Parry, Jonathan Philip. "The impact of Napoleon III on British politics, 1851–1880." Transactions of the Royal Historical Society 11 (2001): 147–175. online; a study in distrust
 Philpott, William James. Anglo-French Relations and Strategy on the Western Front 1914–18 (1996)
 Prete, Roy A. Strategy and Command: The Anglo-French Coalition on the Western Front, 1915 (McGill-Queen's UP, 2021) online review by Michael S. Neiberg
 Reboul, Juliette. French Emigration to Great Britain in Response to the French Revolution (Palgrave Macmillan, 2017).
 Rich, Norman. Great Power Diplomacy: 1814–1914 (1991), comprehensive worldwide survey
 Schmidt, H. D. "The Idea and Slogan of 'Perfidious Albion'" Journal of the History of Ideas (1953) pp: 604–616. ; on French distrust of "Albion" (i.e. England)
 Schroeder, Paul W. The Transformation of European Politics 1763–1848 (1994) 920pp; advanced history and analysis of major diplomacy
 Seton-Watson, R.W. Britain in Europe: 1789–1914 (1937) detailed survey or foreign policy with much on France; online
  Schuman, Frederick L. War and diplomacy in the French Republic; an inquiry into political motivations and the control of foreign policy (1931) 
  Sharp, Alan, & Stone, Glyn, eds. Anglo-French Relations in the Twentieth Century (2000)
 Simms, Brendan, Three Victories and a Defeat: The Rise and Fall of the First British Empire (Penguin Books, 2008), 18th century wars
 Smith, Michael S. Tariff reform in France, 1860–1900: the politics of economic interest (Cornell UP, 1980).
 Taylor, A.J.P. The Struggle for Mastery in Europe 1848–1918 (1954) 638pp; advanced history and analysis of major diplomacy

Since 1919
 Adamthwaite, Anthony. Grandeur and Misery: France's Bid for Power in Europe, 1914–1940 (Hodder Arnold, 1995).
 Alexander, Martin S. and William J. Philpott. Anglo-French Defence Relations Between the Wars (2003), 1919–39 excerpt and text search
 Bell, P. M. H. France and Britain, 1900–1940: Entente and Estrangement (2nd ed. 2014).
 Bell, P. M. H. France and Britain, 1940–1994: The Long Separation (1997).
 Berthon, Simon. Allies at War: The Bitter Rivalry among Churchill, Roosevelt, and de Gaulle (2001). 356 pp.
 Boyce, Robert, ed. French foreign and defence policy, 1918–1940: the decline and fall of a great power (Routledge, 2005).
 Brunschwig, Henri. Anglophobia and French African Policy (Yale UP, 1971).
 Capet, Antoine, ed. Britain, France and the Entente Cordiale Since 1904 (Palgrave Macmillan 2006).
 Chassaigne, Philippe, and Michael Lawrence Dockrill, eds. Anglo-French Relations 1898–1998: From Fashoda to Jospin (Palgrave, 2002) 
 Clarke, Michael. "French and British security: mirror images in a globalized world." International Affairs 76.4 (2000): 725–740. Online
 Crossley, Ceri, and Ian Small, eds. Studies in Anglo French Cultural Relations: Imagining France (1988)
 Davis, Richard. Anglo-French Relations before the Second World War: Appeasement and Crisis (2001) 
 
 Funk, Arthur Layton. Charles de Gaulle: the crucial years, 1943-1944 (1959).
 Grayson, Richard S. Austen Chamberlain and the Commitment to Europe: British Foreign Policy 1924-1929 (Routledge, 2014).
 Johnson, Gaynor. "Sir Austen Chamberlain, the Marquess of Crewe and Anglo-French Relations, 1924–1928." Contemporary British History 25.01 (2011): 49–64. online
 Hucker, Daniel. Public opinion and the end of appeasement in Britain and France (Routledge, 2016).
 Jennings, Eric T. "Britain and Free France in Africa, 1940–1943." in British and French Colonialism in Africa, Asia and the Middle East (Palgrave Macmillan, Cham, 2019) pp. 277–296.
 Keiger, J.F.V. France and the World since 1870 (2001)
 Kolodziej, Edward A. French International Policy under de Gaulle and Pompidou: The Politics of Grandeur (1974)
 Lahav, Pnina. "The Suez Crisis of 1956 and Its Aftermath: A Comparative Study of Constituons, Use of Force, Diplomacy and International Relations." Boston University Law Review 95 (2015): 1297–1354 online
 MacMillan, Margaret, Peacemakers: Six Months that Changed the World (2003) on Versailles Conference of 1919 online
 Maclean, Mairi, and Jean-Marie Trouille, eds. France, Germany and Britain: Partners in a Changing World (Palgrave Macmillan, 2001).
 Mayne, Richard et al. Cross-Channel Currents: 100 Years of the Entente Cordiale (2004) 
 Nere, J. The Foreign Policy of France from 1914 to 1945 (2002)
 Oye, Kenneth A. "The sterling-dollar-franc triangle: Monetary diplomacy 1929–1937." World Politics (1985) 38#1 pp: 173–199.
 Pickles, Dorothy. The Uneasy Entente. French Foreign Policy and Franco-British Misunderstandings (1966).
 Roshwald, Aviel. Estranged Bedfellows: Britain and France in the Middle East During the Second World War (Oxford UP, 1990).
 Scazzieri, Luigi. "Britain, france, and Mesopotamian oil, 1916–1920." Diplomacy & Statecraft 26.1 (2015): 25–45.
 Sharp, Alan et al. eds. Anglo-French Relations in the Twentieth Century: Rivalry and Cooperation (2000) excerpt and text search
 Thomas, Martin. Britain, France and Appeasement: Anglo-French Relations in the Popular Front Era (1996) * Thomas, R. T. Britain and Vichy: The Dilemma of Anglo-French Relations, 1940–42 (1979)
 Torrent, Melanie. Diplomacy and Nation-Building in Africa: Franco-British Relations and Cameroon at the End of Empire (I.B. Tauris, 2012) 409 pages
 Troen, S. Ilan. "The Protocol of Sèvres: British/French/Israeli Collusion Against Egypt, 1956." Israel Studies 1.2 (1996): 122-139 online.
  on 1956.
 Webster, Andrew. Strange Allies: Britain, France and the Dilemmas of Disarmament and Security, 1929-1933 (Routledge, 2019).
 Williams, Andrew. France, Britain and the United States in the Twentieth Century 1900–1940: A Reappraisal (Springer, 2014).
 Zamir, Meir. "De Gaulle and the question of Syria and Lebanon during the Second World War: Part I." Middle Eastern Studies 43.5 (2007): 675–708.

In French
 Guiffan, Jean. Histoire de l'anglophobie en France: de Jeanne d'Arc à la vache folle (Terre de brume, 2004)
 Nordmann, Claude. "Anglomanie et Anglophobie en France au XVIIIe siècle'." Revue du Nord 66 (1984) pp: 787–803.
 Serodes, Fabrice. "French – English: 100 Years of “Friendly Disagreement?", Europeplusnet (2004)
 Serodes, Fabrice. "'Historical use of a caricature. The destiny of the perfidious Albion.", Brussels, VUB, 2009.
 Serodes, Fabrice Anglophobie et politique de Fachoda à Mers el-Kebir (L Harmattan, 2010)
 Serodes, Fabrice "Brexit: le Royaume-Uni sort, ses idées restent", The Conversation, 17 January 2017

External links
 
 Franco-British Council Links
 University of London in Paris (ULIP)
 French Embassy in the United Kingdom
 British Embassy in France

 
United Kingdom
Bilateral relations of the United Kingdom